Ouzera is a town and commune in Médéa Province, Algeria.

Geography 
Situated in northern Algeria, the city is along the Tell Atlas mountain range. It is just south of Chrea National Park. The climate is quite cool, averaging 50 to 60 degrees year round.

References

Communes of Médéa Province